Maurus is a Latin given name. It can refer to:

Persons
Saints
 Saint Maurus of Parentium (3rd century), the first bishop of Parentium and the patron saint of Poreč
 Saint Maurus (c. 500 - c. 584), the first disciple of St. Benedict of Nursia
 Blessed Maurus Magnentius Rabanus (Hrabanus) (c. 776 (784?) - 856) 
 Saint Maurus of Pécs, the second bishop of Pécs, and abbey of Pannonhalma (c. 1000-c. 1075)
Others
  (c.1130 - 1214), medical writer and teacher
 Mister Maurus, an archetypical school teacher developed by Anton Hansen Tammsaare
 Sylvester Maurus (1619-1687), Italian Jesuit theologian
 Kuber (Maurus the Kuber), brother to Tervel's father Asparukh and son of Kubrat Kaghan of Patria Onoguria
 Maurus, religious name of secret agent monk Alexander Horn

Other uses
The inhabitants of Mauretania, ancient kingdom and late Roman province
 Maurus, a genus of gossamer-winged butterflies

See also
Mauro (disambiguation)
Maura (disambiguation)
Mauritius (given name)
San Mauro (disambiguation)